A list of universities in Spain:

See also 
 Higher education in Spain
 List of colleges and universities by country
 List of colleges and universities

 
Universities
Spain
Spain